Daniel Bassel House is a historic home located at Lost Creek, Harrison County, West Virginia.  It was built between 1860 and 1865, and is a five bay, double pile red brick house with a hipped roof. It sits on a sandstone foundation. In the 1890s, a Queen Anne style full length porch was added to the front facade.

It was listed on the National Register of Historic Places in 2002.

References

Houses on the National Register of Historic Places in West Virginia
Houses completed in 1865
National Register of Historic Places in Harrison County, West Virginia
Queen Anne architecture in West Virginia
Houses in Harrison County, West Virginia